The Nation of Domination (NOD) was a professional wrestling heel faction that competed in the World Wrestling Federation (WWF, now WWE) from November 17, 1996 to November 28, 1998.

The group was formed by newcomer Faarooq in 1996 and remained an influencing faction in the company during the Attitude Era. While in the group, The Rock was a one-time Intercontinental Champion and D'Lo Brown was a two-time European Champion.

Concept 
The group was based loosely on the Nation of Islam and a Librate street gang lifestyle, (with group members adopting Islamic names and wearing Muslim headgear) and the Black Panther Party and being billed from the Streets of the Hood. The extremism of the group's pro-black theme at times including the "Nation Salute" and Faarooq's angry tirades on the microphone garnered them an excessive amount of heat from fans in arenas and Faarooq was calling himself the "Dictator of the Nation"

History

United States Wrestling Association (1996) 
The original Nation of Domination was formed in 1996 in the United States Wrestling Association (USWA). The group was led by PG-13, (a tag team consisting of J. C. Ice and Wolfie D). Additional members included Kareem Olajuwon, Sir Mohammad, Elijah, Brakkus, Shaquille Ali, Randy X, and Queen Moisha.

World Wrestling Federation

First NOD in WWF (1996–1997) 
A separate group named Nation of Domination was the heel faction formed in the WWF when wrestler Faarooq was joined by manager Clarence Mason. On the October 28, 1996 edition of Monday Night Raw, announcer Jim Ross revealed that Faarooq had taken Mason as his new manager after Ross recommended Mason's services for a lawsuit against Ahmed Johnson.  Ross noted the duo would appear on WWF Livewire that Saturday with "big changes" in store for Faarooq, meaning the dropping of his "Roman gladiator" gimmick in Favor of a  Nation dictator The two men were also accompanied by three actors, Albert Armstrong, Charles Hines, and Richard Beach, whose names were unacknowledged on screen and were supposed to represent other members of the Nation. Many wrestlers joined the heel stable over time including PG-13 (J. C. Ice and Wolfie D), Crush, D'Lo Brown, and Savio Vega. Their first feud was with Ahmed Johnson, who had a rivalry with Faarooq since SummerSlam. At the Royal Rumble, the Nation assisted Faarooq during his match against Johnson. Faarooq lost by disqualification after Crush interfered and attacked Johnson.

Faarooq, Crush, and Vega were the members of Nation of Domination who wrestled while others supported them during their matches. These three men often teamed up together in six-man tag team matches such as one at In Your House 13: Final Four against Bart Gunn, Goldust, and Flash Funk and most notably in a Chicago Street Fight at WrestleMania 13 against the Legion of Doom (Hawk and Animal) and Ahmed Johnson. At A Cold Day In Hell, the Nation faced Johnson in a Gauntlet match. Johnson defeated Crush and Vega in the Gauntlet before losing to Faarooq.

JC Ice and Wolfie D were removed from the Nation after a loss to the Legion of Doom, the Nation effectively abandoning them to their fate. Faarooq became angry with the rest of the group and fired the entire Nation with the exception of Brown after Faarooq's loss to The Undertaker at King of the Ring, where Faarooq lost the match partly because of the distraction caused when Vega and Crush were arguing at ringside. According to Clarence Mason, he requested to be removed from the group because backstage he was uncomfortable with Faarooq doing racist remarks in promos and also Vince McMahon wanted managers to start taking more bumps and participate in matches.

Black Supremacy and The Gang Warz (1997–1998) 
On the June 16 episode of Raw Is War, Faarooq promised that he would deliver a "Bigger, Badder, Better and Blacker" version of the Nation, after "firing" Crush, Mason, and Savio Vega, retaining only Brown. This led to the induction of Kama Mustafa and Ahmed Johnson into the group after Johnson turned on then WWF Champion The Undertaker during a tag team match against Faarooq and Kama. Johnson would be forced out of the group due to a legit injury. He was replaced by Rocky Maivia. Meanwhile, former Nation members Vega and Crush formed their own rival factions, Los Boricuas (made up entirely of Puerto Rican wrestlers), and The Disciples of Apocalypse (made up entirely of white biker wrestlers) respectively. This led to a WWF style "gang war".

In the following months, the Nation feuded with Los Boricuas and the Disciples of Apocalypse. This feud culminated in a triple threat match between Faarooq, Vega, and Crush who were the leaders of Nation, Los Boricuas, and DOA respectively at Ground Zero, which Vega won. They restarted their feud with the Legion of Doom, whom the Nation defeated at Badd Blood: In Your House in a 3-on-2 handicap match. As part of his heel turn, Rocky Maivia shortened and changed his ring name to The Rock. Around this time, Ahmed Johnson restarted the feud with the Nation as well and joined the Legion of Doom and Ken Shamrock. This led to a Survivor Series match at Survivor Series, which the Nation lost to the Legion of Doom, Johnson, and Shamrock. At D-Generation X: In Your House, The Rock got a shot at the Intercontinental Championship against Stone Cold Steve Austin. In the closing minutes of the match, Austin performed a Stone Cold Stunner on the referee. A second referee came down to count a pin for Austin, although the first referee intended to disqualify Austin.

As a result of this controversy, Austin was forced to defend the title against The Rock the next night on Raw Is War. Rock was awarded the Intercontinental Championship, however, after Austin forfeited him the title instead of defending the title in a rematch, delivering a stunner on Rock and took the championship belt back afterward. Austin appeared the next week on Raw is War, taunting Rock and eventually throwing the Intercontinental Championship belt over a bridge, into a river. Ken Shamrock, who was already a rival of the Nation, began feuding with The Rock for the Intercontinental Championship. On the January 12, 1998 episode of Raw Is War, Mark Henry turned heel and joined the Nation, by assaulting his tag team partner, Ken Shamrock, in a tag team match against The Rock and D'Lo Brown.

Leadership of The Rock (1998) 
On the March 30, 1998 episode of Raw Is War, the night after WrestleMania XIV, The Rock went on to usurp leadership of the Nation from Faarooq, at which point the group permanently dropped "of Domination" from its name and its militant focus. Instead, The Rock's gimmick spread throughout the faction with Nation members taking on considerably more hip characters, the most notable being Kama Mustafa's transformation into The Godfather, D'Lo Brown's "bobble-head" and strut, and a new hip version of the group's entrance theme, that would become associated with The Rock's character and be remixed over and over during the years to become his current theme. The Nation's primary focus by now was that The Rock retained the Intercontinental title "by any means necessary", which was the group's motto. They mainly feuded with Faarooq, who had just been kicked out of the stable. At Mayhem in Manchester, The Rock and D'Lo Brown lost to Ken Shamrock and Owen Hart. At Unforgiven: In Your House, The Nation lost to Shamrock, Faarooq, and Steve Blackman in a six-man tag team match. On the April 27 episode of Raw Is War, The Rock and Mark Henry faced Shamrock and Hart in a tag team match that saw Hart attacking Shamrock and joining the Nation.

The group then engaged in a rivalry with D-Generation X (DX), which saw the infamous parody DX performed in which they spoofed Nation members; Rock thoroughly humiliating Chyna by alluding to a possible romantic encounter between the two while the rest of DX were held at bay in their locker room by a forklift; a street fight between the two groups that wound up in Triple H being, in particular, singled out by the rest of the group and being beaten down with a ladder after Southern Justice interfered with the match on the Nation's behalf; the ladder match for the Intercontinental Championship between the two at SummerSlam; and X-Pac and Brown trading back and forth the European Championship. The Nation and DX also wrestled in a six-man tag team match at Over the Edge: In Your House, which the Nation won.

Fall of Nation (1998) 
Toward the end of the year, the group showed signs of dissension as Rock's mannerisms and swagger began to catch on with fans. This would lead the WWF to turn The Rock face. Hart left the group when he "injured" Dan Severn following a botched reverse piledriver on Raw Is War the night after Breakdown. The incident was a mimicry of the legit incident in which Hart injured Stone Cold Steve Austin using the same move a year earlier. The guilt from the injury to Severn led Hart to "retire", but then re-surface as The Blue Blazer, effectively ending his affiliation with the Nation. The Godfather would venture out on his own as a fan favorite, bringing with him a bevy of beauties to the ring before his match with any wrestler. Rock would later be assaulted by Brown and Henry in October 1998 which would ultimately be the end of the Nation as a faction. After kicking Godfather out of the group on the Sunday Night Heat episode before Judgment Day: In Your House, Brown and Henry briefly continued using the Nation name, a modified Titantron, and music until dropping all three by year's end as they moved on to the tag team division without the Nation moniker.

Aftermath 
Shortly after the Nation was disbanded, The Rock decided to run solo, riding his immense rise in popularity. He won the WWF Championship at Survivor Series and turned heel again by joining Mr. McMahon's Corporation faction. He would subsequently enjoy several years of success, not just in the world of wrestling, but also in Hollywood. He retired from professional wrestling in 2019. Owen Hart would go on to form a successful tag team with Jeff Jarrett, and later revive his Blue Blazer character before his death in May 1999.

D'Lo Brown and Mark Henry would remain a tag team following the dissolution of the Nation, enjoying moderate success. After Brown attempted to help Henry lose weight, Henry turned on Brown in the summer of 1999, ending the final remnants of the Nation of Domination. Brown would eventually hold both the Intercontinental and European titles at the height of his popularity. Henry would form his "Sexual Chocolate" character and would later be awarded the European Championship by Jeff Jarrett later that year. Henry would also go onto win the ECW World Heavyweight Championship and the World Heavyweight Championship later in his career before retiring in 2017. The Nation had something of a reunion in late 1999 when D'Lo realigned himself with The Godfather, imitating his pimp gimmick. This alliance lasted all the way into early 2000, when D'Lo turned on The Godfather, thus ending the tag team. The Godfather would later win the Intercontinental and World Tag Team Championships in the following years.

Former leader Faarooq would also find success after the group's dissolution, going onto to form the highly popular tag team the Acolytes Protection Agency (APA) with Bradshaw. The APA would later win the World Tag Team Championship three times before disbanding in 2004.

As of now, The Rock, Faarooq, and Godfather are the only former members still employed by the WWE while Henry is employed by All Elite Wrestling. Rock is signed on a part-time basis, while also being one of the highest paid movie stars in the world, Faarooq makes occasional appearances under his real name of Ron Simmons since his 2004 retirement, and Godfather was released in 2002 and retired to manage a gentleman's club; he still occasionally makes guest appearances in WWE. Brown was released by WWE in 2003, but was rehired in 2008; he was let go once again the following year. Henry is currently part of AEW Rampage broadcast team as a backstage interviewer. Faarooq, Godfather and Henry were inducted into the WWE Hall of Fame in 2012, 2016, and 2018 respectively.

Reunion
Qatar Pro Wrestling announced on April 26, 2021 that Henry, Brown, Godfather and Faarooq had reprised their roles as the Nation of Domination. They appeared at the QPW SuperSlam 3 in Doha on February 26, 2022.

Members

USWA 
 PG-13 (J. C. Ice and Wolfie D)
 Kareem Olajuwon (Reggie B. Fine)
 Sir Mohammad
 Akeem Mohammad (Big Black Dog)
 Elijah
 Shaquille Ali
 Queen Moisha
 Randy X (Randy Hales)

WWF 
 Faarooq (November 17, 1996 – March 30, 1998)
 Clarence Mason (November 17, 1996 – June 9, 1997)
 J. C. Ice (November 17, 1996 – May 12, 1997)
 Wolfie D (November 17, 1996 – May 12, 1997)
 Crush (December 15, 1996 – June 9, 1997)
 D'Lo Brown (January 4, 1997 – November 28, 1998)
 Savio Vega (January 25, 1997 – June 9, 1997)
 Kama Mustafa/The Godfather (June 16, 1997 – October 18, 1998)
 Ahmed Johnson (June 16, 1997 – August 4, 1997)
 Rocky Maivia/The Rock (August 11, 1997 – October 12, 1998)
 Mark Henry (January 12, 1998 – November 28, 1998)
 Owen Hart (April 27, 1998 – October 5, 1998)

Incarnations 

 First incarnation (heel): The Nation of Domination: Nation Gang/Hood Thugs
 Type: stable
 Active: November 17, 1996 - December 15, 1996 – June 9, 1997
 Members: Faarooq (leader), Queen Moisha (valet) Clarence Mason, J. C. Ice, Wolfie D, D'Lo Brown, Crush, Savio Vega, Sir Mohammad, Elijah, Albert Armstrong, Charles Hines, Richard Beach
 Second incarnation (heel): The Nation of Domination
 Type: stable
 Active: June 9, 1997 – March 30, 1998
 Members: Faarooq (leader), Rocky Maivia/The Rock, Kama Mustafa, D'Lo Brown, Ahmed Johnson, Mark Henry
 Third incarnation (heel): The Nation
 Type: stable
 Active: March 30, 1998 – October 18, 1998
 Members: The Rock (leader), Owen Hart, D'Lo Brown, The Godfather, Mark Henry
 Fourth Incarnation (heel): The Nation
 Type: tag team
 Active: October 18, 1998 – November 28, 1998 ("The Nation" name was dropped; Brown and Henry continued on as a team without it)
 Members: D'Lo Brown, Mark Henry

Championships and accomplishments 
 World Wrestling Federation
 WWF European Championship (2 times) – D'Lo Brown
 WWF Intercontinental Championship (1 time) – The Rock

References

External links 
 Nation of Domination's OWW Profile
 Brian Adams' (Crush) OWW Profile
 The Rock's WWE Profile
 Ron Simmons' (Faarooq) WWE Profile
 Mark Henry's WWE Profile
 Owen Hart's OWW Profile
 Ahmed Johnson's OWW Profile
 D'Lo Brown's OWW Profile
 Savio Vega's OWW Profile
 Godfather's (Kama Mustafa) OWW Profile
 Clarence Mason's OWW Profile
 PG-13's OWW Profile

United States Wrestling Association teams and stables
WWE teams and stables